The Army Group North Ukraine was a major formation of the German army in World War II.

History
It was created on 5 April 1944 by renaming Army Group South under Generalfeldmarschall Walter Model. In April 1944 it consisted of 1st Panzer Army and 4th Panzer Army. In the summer of 1944 it opposed the Red Army's 1st Ukrainian Front during the Lvov-Sandomir strategic offensive operation (13 July - 29 August 1944). In August 1944 the 4th Panzer Army and the 17th Army defended between Carpathian mountains and the Pripyet swamps in Galicia. In September 1944 it was renamed to Army Group A.

Order of battle
The composition of the Army Group on 15 July 1944 was:

 4th Panzer Army
 XXXXVI Panzer Corps
 XXXXII Corps
 LVI Panzer Corps
 VIII Corps
 1st Panzer Army
 LIX Corps
 XXIV Panzer Corps
 XXXXVIII Panzer Corps
 III Panzer Corps
 20th Panzer Grenadier Division
 14th SS Grenadier Division
 1st Hungarian Army
 VI Hungarian Corps
 XI Corps
 VII Hungarian Corps
 2nd Hungarian Mountain Brigade
 19th Hungarian Reserve Division
 2nd Hungarian Panzer Division
 Kampfgruppe, 19th SS Panzer Grenadier Division

Commanders 

Chief of Staff

See also
Army Group South

Footnotes

References

External links
Lexikon der Wehrmacht

Army groups of the German Army in World War II
Military units and formations established in 1944
Military units and formations disestablished in 1944